Kentucky Knife Fight was an American rock band from St. Louis, Missouri. Active since 2005, the band had been a congruent force alongside Pokey LaFarge, So Many Dynamos and Sleepy Kitty in bringing national attention to a re-emerging St. Louis music scene. Their sound is generally classified as Noir Blues, combining pre-rock elements of blues, dark-bluegrass, and jazz with punk, pop, and twang influences.

History 
Kentucky Knife Fight was formed by original members Jason Holler, Nate Jones, Jason "Mr. Cool" Koenig, and "Handsome" James Baker during their time at Southern Illinois University Edwardsville. Holler and Koenig met as high school classmates in  Quincy, IL  and reunited in 2005 while both attending SIUE. While at a small concert together at the historic Stagger Inn in  Edwardsville, the two watched the Southern Illinois  dark-bluegrass band The Woodbox Gang. After the concert, Holler and Koenig decided to start a band that would infuse  Americana roots, dark narrative themes, and the  garage and proto-punk influences which were undergoing a revival at the time. Employing James Baker on drums and Nate Jones on guitar, the 4-piece began holding songwriting sessions to write original material. On April 22, 2005, using small practice amps and borrowed PA gear, the unnamed 4-piece group performed two original songs at an open mic night held at the Stagger Inn. Later in 2005, the group added David Wiatrolik, a classmate of Koenig's in the SIUE music department, to the band as a second guitar and banjo player.

In January, 2010, David Wiatrolik announced he would be leaving the band. After a final performance at Edwardsville's Stagger Inn on May 6, 2010, Curtis J Brewer became the newest member, taking over as the band's second guitarist and banjo player.

In February, 2010, Jason Koenig contacted Brewer about filling in for an April, 22 show opening for Th' Legendary Shack Shakers that the band had committed to before learning of Wiatrolik's exiting plan. Brewer, a musician and educator in the St. Louis area, agreed to play the show. At the first rehearsal with Brewer, the group was impressed enough with Brewer learning all of their songs, asked if he was interested in playing in Kentucky Knife Fight full-time. The first performance with Brewer on guitar and banjo was April 17, 2010, at Vintage Vinyl for Record Store Day. Their first official show with the current lineup was on April 22, 2010 opening for Th' Legendary Shack Shakers at The Firebird (St. Louis).

Filming for their first official music video (for the song "Love the Lonely") began in February 2011. The videos theme and concept was created by Holler and directed by Ryan Frank of St. Louis' First Punch Film Productions. St. Louis Magazine, while interviewing Holler in 2013, wrote that "...The result, Holler feels, captured the “dark, noirish, and moody” feel the group wanted, with Holler cast as a cabdriver, ferrying various St. Louis characters through a loving (or lovelorn) night. The song was subsequently used for the entire opening-credit sequence of the film 23 Minutes to Sunrise, directed by St. Louisan Jay Kanzler and starring Eric Roberts."

On August 4, 2012, Kentucky Knife Fight performed in St. Louis for the release of the Misshapen Love / Love the Lonely vinyl 7" single (released on the St. Louis-based label Throwing Things Records).

On March 2, 2013, Kentucky Knife Fight released their full-length album Hush Hush to a sold-out crowd at the famed St. Louis concert venue, Off Broadway. The concert was filmed in its entirety and released for free online streaming.

The band toured relentlessly after the release of "Hush Hush," but announced plans in September 2014 to end the band. Kentucky Knife Fight gave their last performance in front of a sold-out crowd on Saturday, November 22, 2014 at the St. Louis venue Off Broadway.

Members 

Band Members
Jason Holler - vocals, harmonica (2005–2014)
Curtis J Brewer - guitar, banjo, vocals (2010–2014)
Nate Jones - guitar, vocals (2005–2014)
Jason "Mr. Cool" Koenig - bass, vocals (2005–2014)
James Baker - drums, percussion (2005–2014)
Nathan Jatcko - keyboards, organ (2012–2014)
David Wiatrolik - guitar, banjo, vocals (2006–2010)

Awards

Appearances 
Alongside indie-rock cohorts The Blind Eyes, Kentucky Knife Fight performed for the 2010, 2011, & 2012 New Year's Eve blowout event at famed St. Louis venue Off Broadway. The sold-out shows featured original sets from both bands and a super-group (dubbed Dino's House Band) set of cover songs performed throughout the night.
Kentucky Knife Fight performed for the SXSW 2011 & 2012 day parties for 88.1 KDHX at Jovita's in Austin, TX, alongside acts such as Nikka Costa, Joe Pug, JC & the Uptown Sound and Nikki Lane.
In 2011, 2012, and 2013, Kentucky Knife Fight was selected as featured act for the MidPoint Music Festival in Cincinnati, OH.
The group performed  in November 2012 as direct support for Rev. Horton Heat at Springfield, IL's 900 capacity concert venue, Donnie's Homespun.
Their song "Love the Lonely" was licensed for the opening credits of the full-length motion picture 23 Minutes to Sunrise.
In August, 2013, Kentucky Knife Fight performed as direct support for Lucero for a sold-out crowd on day 2 of the Open Highway Festival (St. Louis, MO)
Kentucky Knife Fight was selected as one of three St. Louis bands to perform for the 2013 Loufest Music Festival held in Forest Park on September 7 & 8, 2013 (St. Louis, MO). The festival featured acts such as Wilco, The Killers, The National, The Alabama Shakes, Jim James, and more.
Bloomington, IN musical group Murder by Death hosted Kentucky Knife Fight as direct support on a Mid-West tour in September 2013.
Dallax, Tx musical group Old 97's hosted Kentucky Knife Fight as direct support on a North US tour in June 2014.
Kentucky Knife Fight performed their farewell show on November 22, 2014 at the St. Louis venue Off Broadway. The sold-out show also featured original sets from support acts (and long-time touring contemporaries) Whiskey Folk Ramblers and Christian Lee Hutson.

Discography

References 

Rock music groups from Missouri
Musical groups from St. Louis
Musical groups established in 2005